Emilin may refer to:

EMILIN1, protein in humans
Emilín (footballer, born May 1912), born Emilio Alonso Larrazabal, Spanish football forward
Emilín (footballer, born September 1912), born Emilio García Martínez, Spanish football forward